Petra Kvitová was the defending champion, but lost to Kiki Bertens in the quarterfinals in a replay of the previous year's final.

Bertens went on to win the title, defeating Simona Halep in the final, 6–4, 6–4. She became the first woman to win the tournament without losing a single set.

Naomi Osaka, Halep and Angelique Kerber were in contention for the WTA no. 1 singles ranking at the beginning of the tournament. Osaka retained the ranking following Kerber's withdrawal in the second round, and Halep's subsequent defeat in the final.

Seeds

Draw

Finals

Top half

Section 1

Section 2

Bottom half

Section 3

Section 4

Qualifying

Seeds

Qualifiers

Draw

First qualifier

Second qualifier

Third qualifier

Fourth qualifier

Fifth qualifier

Sixth qualifier

Seventh qualifier

Eighth qualifier

References

External links
 Main Draw
 Qualifying Draw

Women's - Singles